Penicillium singorense is a species of fungus in the genus Penicillium which was isolated from house dust in the city Songkhla in Thailand.

References 

singorense
Fungi described in 2014